The Belgian railway line 162 is a railway line in Belgium connecting Namur to the Luxembourg border at Sterpenich (Arlon). Completed in 1859, the line runs 146.8 km. Together with the Belgian railway line 161 (Brussels – Namur) and the CFL Line 50 (Sterpenich – Luxembourg City), it forms the important rail link between Brussels and Luxembourg.

August 2022 work will start on having the electrification switched over to 25kV these works are part of a desire to increase the speed, load and frequency of rail traffic.

Stations
The main interchange stations on line 162 are:

Namur: to Brussels, Liège, Dinant and Charleroi 
Marloie: to Marche-en-Famenne and Liège
Libramont: to Bertrix and Virton
Arlon: to Athus and Rodange

References

162
Railway lines opened in 1858
3000 V DC railway electrification